The Lexington Financial Center, locally known as "Fifth Third" or the "Big Blue Building", is a , 410 ft (125 m) 31-floor high-rise in Lexington, Kentucky. It is located between Vine Street and Main Street at South Mill Street. Its exterior features blue tinted glass that has become an identifying symbol for the downtown. It is the tallest building in Kentucky outside Louisville.

It was originally proposed as a 26-story skyscraper in 1984 across from the Vine Center and replaced the failed project, the Galleria. The Lexington Financial Center was to be four stories and several linear feet taller than the then-tallest Kincaid Towers. It was projected that $32 million in private funds would be secured.

$7.5 million in state aid was announced by then-Governor Martha Layne Collins towards the construction of a six-level parking structure that would serve Triangle Center and the Lexington Financial Center.

Construction was completed in 1987. Upon completion, it housed the Webb Company, the Bank of Lexington, Sherman, Carter, Barnhart Architects and a law firm. Today, it houses the Fifth Third Bank among other financial institutions, including Kentucky Employers' Mutual Insurance

See also
 Cityscape of Lexington, Kentucky

References

Skyscraper office buildings in Lexington, Kentucky
Office buildings completed in 1987